Bishop Thomas K. Gorman Catholic School is a parochial Catholic high school and middle school in Tyler, Texas, United States. It is located in the Roman Catholic Diocese of Tyler.

Background

The school was established in 1958 and is named for Thomas Kiely Gorman, the fourth bishop of the Roman Catholic Diocese of Dallas from 1954 to 1964.  At the time of its founding, the school was within the boundaries of the Diocese of Dallas.  The eastern portion of the Diocese of Dallas was ceded to the Diocese of Tyler, which was established in 1987.

It has been ranked as a Top 50 Catholic High School since 2004.

Facilities
Bishop Thomas K. Gorman maintains several facilities for academic, athletic, and community purposes.
 Main Campus Building
 Saints Peter and Paul Chapel
 Holy Family Library
 McCallum Stadium (football) (soccer)
 Haddad Gym
 Milam Joseph Center
 Baseball Field
 Carney Softball Field
 Tennis Courts
 Field House
 Master's Garden
 Brodnax Family Crusader Center

Athletics

Fall Athletic Offerings
 Cheerleading
 Cross Country
 Dance
 Football
 Ladies Volleyball

Winter Interscholastic Sports
 Basketball
 Cheerleading
 Soccer
 Wrestling
 Swimming

Spring Interscholastic Sports
 Track
 Baseball
 Softball
 Golf
 Tennis

Technology

Mac desktop computers in art room and computer labs. Wacom drawing tablets for use of students. Each high school student receives a Macbook at the beginning of the school year. Middle school students provided with Chromebooks.

State championships
State Championships won by Bishop Thomas K. Gorman:

 Overall State Champions - 2001, 2002
 Academic State Champions - 1999, 2000, 2001, 2002
 Middle School Academic (PSIA) - 2014
 Choir - 2002, 2006, 2010
 Academics - 1999, 2000, 2002
 Ladies Track - 1999, 2000, 2001, 2002, 2003, 2004, 2005, 2006
 Ladies Cross Country- 2020
 Men's Cross Country - 2001
 Women's Cross Country - 2004, 2005, 2006
 Football - 1984, 1995
 Soccer - 2000, 2001
 Golf - 1991, 1992
 Men's Track - 2000, 2002
 Men's Basketball - 1987, 1988
 Women's Tennis - 1980, 1984
 Men's Tennis - 1984

The Bishop Thomas K Gorman high school ladies track team currently holds the record for the most consecutive state championships in TAPPS history, having won the state Track & Field championship every year from 1999 to 2006. The Bishop Gorman Ladies Cross Country team places consistently at TAPPS state championships.

Notable alumni
 George Cumby (NFL linebacker, college football All-American)

Notes and references

External links
 

Catholic secondary schools in Texas
Educational institutions established in 1958
High schools in Tyler, Texas
Schools in Smith County, Texas
1958 establishments in Texas
Private middle schools in Texas